Malie Lagendijk Coyne is an Irish psychologist and author.

Background
Coyne was born in Ireland. She is the daughter of a diplomat.

As an adolescent, she attended Seoul Foreign School in Seoul, South Korea before beginning her undergraduate studies. Between 1998 and 2002, Coyne received her undergraduate degree in psychology and a Master of Science from Trinity College Dublin. In 2007, Coyne received a Doctor of Psychological Science title from the National University of Ireland, Galway.

In 2020, Coyne released her first best-selling book Love In, Love Out published by HarperCollins.

Honors
 Mental Health Media Awards (2019)

Books
 Love In, Love Out (2020)

Personal life
In mass media, Coyne has spoken publicly about her past struggles with eating disorders during adolescence. Coyne's past experiences led to her increasing awareness about mental health issues in appearances on Irish print, radio, and television.

References

External links
 Official Website
 Official Instagram
 Radio Archives

Living people
Irish psychologists
Irish women psychologists
Psychology writers
21st-century Irish non-fiction writers
Year of birth missing (living people)